USS Bowditch (AG 30) was first launched in 1929 by Burmeister and Wain in Copenhagen, Denmark, as the passenger ship Santa Inez. She was later purchased by the United States Navy on 4 March 1940 and temporarily commissioned on 12 March 1940. She was outfitted as a surveying vessel by the Norfolk Navy Yard and commissioned again on 1 July 1940.

Following the commissioning of the USS Bowditch the ship made numerous geodetic surveys in places such as Little Placentia Bay, Newfoundland, Bermuda, the Bahamas, Jamaica, Cuba, and Haiti. Departing Norfolk on 9 January 1942, she steamed south to conduct surveys of the waters between Panama and Colombia, off the Galápagos Islands, and off the Cocos Islands in Costa Rica. Returning to Norfolk for repairs on 21 November 1942, she departed for south  again on 17 February 1943. After survey work in the Caribbean through May, she transited the Panama Canal to work along the coasts of Panama, Colombia, and Ecuador. Bowditch was reclassified as "AGS-4" on 1 December 1943.

Assigned to Service Force, Pacific Fleet, she arrived at Pearl Harbor 6 January 1944. Bowditch served as a survey ship during the invasion of Kwajalein and Majuro Atolls (4 February - 2 April 1944); occupation of Saipan (22 July - 4 October); and the capture of Okinawa (18 April - 2 September 1945). Bowditch remained off Okinawa until 3 November 1945 when she departed for the United States. She arrived at San Francisco 29 November. On 17 February 1946 she sailed for Bikini Atoll to begin preliminary surveys for Operation Crossroads. She continued surveying at Bikini after the atomic bomb tests, returning to San Francisco 19 October 1946.

Bowditch left San Francisco for Norfolk 23 November and was decommissioned there 31 January 1947. She was transferred to the Maritime Commission 9 June 1948.

Bowditch received three battle stars for her World War II service.

References

External links
Smithsonian webpage on the Bikini Survey "Operation Crossroads" expedition

World War II auxiliary ships of the United States
Ships built in Copenhagen
1919 ships
Survey ships of the United States Navy